Glucose-regulated protein is a protein in the endoplasmic reticulum in the cell.

It comes in several different molecular masses, including:
Grp78 (78 kDa) 
Grp94 (94 kDa)
Grp170 (170 kDa), which is a human chaperone protein

References

Endoplasmic reticulum resident proteins